Shanthanu Bhagyaraj (born 24 August 1986) is an Indian actor who has worked predominantly in Tamil language films. The son of actors K. Bhagyaraj and Poornima Bhagyaraj, Shanthanu appeared as a child artist in his father's Vettiya Madichu Kattu (1998), before making his debut as a lead actor in the romantic comedy Sakkarakatti (2008).He also has a YouTube channel with his wife called With Love Shanthnu Kiki.

Career

1998-2008
Shanthanu made his acting debut as a child artist in his father Bhagyaraj's film Vettiya Madichu Kattu (1998), and then worked as assistant director to his father in his sister, Saranya Bhagyaraj's debut project Parijatham (2006).

Shanthanu appeared in his first lead role in the college-based romantic comedy Sakkarakatti (2008), appearing alongside actresses Ishita Sharma and Vedhika. His performance received mixed reviews with Behindwoods.com stating: "Shanthanu has to play a thinly sketched hero, but he puts energy and charm into everything he does" and that "he is more than promising- he's star material, and he'll survive this wreck". Another critic at Sify.com stated that he "has that star quality to him which is so rare to find these days, but is wasted in a role in which he just romances his heroines and dances". Despite having a popular soundtrack composed by A. R. Rahman, the film received largely negative reviews and became a box office failure. Despite the negative reception to the film, Shanthanu was recognised with the Best Male Debut Actor award at the Filmfare Awards and the Vijay Awards.

2009-2012
After Sakkarakatti, Shanthanu appeared in the Malayalam film Angel John (2009), starring alongside Mohanlal and Nithya Menen, as a suicidal youth who is rescued by an angel. Despite the high-profile cast, the film and Shanthanu's performance received mixed reviews and it did not perform well commercially. The failure of his initial films meant that his next projects had significantly smaller budgets and lower profile releases. His next release was his father's bilingual directorial venture Siddu +2 (2010), with the failure of the Tamil version causing the Telugu version Love in Hyderabad, to be shelved. Though the romantic comedy Kandaen (2011) received positive reviews and took a good opening, his subsequent films including the action drama Aayiram Vilakku (2011) and Thangar Bachan's Ammavin Kaipesi (2012) and the courtroom drama Vaaimai (2016) received negative reviews and did not perform well at the box office.

2016-2017
The courtroom drama Vaaimai (2016) received average reviews at the box office. In an interview in 2016, Shanthanu revealed that challenging career choices had plagued his film career and he would subsequently not take advice from his father regarding film offers. He mentioned his regret at missing out on potential projects he had been offered including Boys (2003), Kaadhal (2004) Subramaniapuram (2008) and Kalavani (2010).

Shanthanu was then cast by Parthiban to play the lead role in Koditta Idangalai Nirappuga (2017), with the director suggesting that he was keen to portray tribute to his mentor K. Bhagyaraj, by casting his son in a film. The actor called the film his "re-launch in Tamil cinema" and underwent a makeover to portray the lead role of a non-resident Indian who falls in love with a married woman played by Parvathy Nair. Shanthanu won positive reviews for his performance, with a critic from The New Indian Express stating: "Shanthnu is a revelation here" and "with controlled, mature take on his role, Shanthnu displays subtle nuances of expression as Kevin travels from uncertainty and confusion, to guilt and regret". In 2017, he also acted in Adhiroopan's drama Mupparimanam, where he portrayed a medical student.

2020-present
In 2020, he played a main role in the family drama Vaanam Kottattum, which was co-written by Mani Ratnam. He also starred in Master (2021). After Chimbu Deven's Kasada Thapara, he starred in an adult comedy, Murungakkai Chips.

Filmography
All films are in Tamil, unless otherwise noted.
As actor

Short films 

KoCoNaKa (2020)

Songs 
Oru Chance Kudu (2020)
Enga Pora De (2020)
Gundumalli (2021)

Television

As singer

References

Living people
Male actors from Chennai
Tamil male actors
Loyola College, Chennai alumni
Filmfare Awards South winners
Male actors in Tamil cinema
Male actors in Malayalam television
Indian male television actors
Indian male playback singers
Tamil playback singers
20th-century Indian male actors
21st-century Indian male actors
1986 births